Morinville-St. Albert is a provincial electoral district in Alberta, Canada. The district is one of the 87 districts mandated to return a single member (MLA) to the Legislative Assembly of Alberta using the first past the post method of voting. It was contested for the first time in the 2019 Alberta election.

Geography
The district lies to the north of Edmonton, covering the part of Sturgeon County east of Highway 2 and the part of the City of St. Albert northeast of Boudreau Road. It contains the communities of Morinville, Legal, Bon Accord, Gibbons, and Redwater. It also includes CFB Edmonton. The other major highway in the district is Highway 28.

History

The district was created in 2017 when the Electoral Boundaries Commission recommended abolishing Barrhead-Morinville-Westlock and Athabasca-Sturgeon-Redwater, creating a new riding from the southern portions of the two and a small part of St. Albert. The Commission reasoned that St. Albert and Morinville were a natural fit, owing to their shared franco-Albertan heritage.

Electoral results

References

Alberta provincial electoral districts
Politics of St. Albert, Alberta
2017 establishments in Alberta
Constituencies established in 2017